Michael Edwards (born 14 April 1974) is a former professional rugby league footballer who played in the 1990s and 2000s.

International honours
Edwards won two caps for Wales while at Oldham in 1995.

References

External links
Statistics at orl-heritagetrust.org.uk
(archived by web.archive.org) Wales RL Heritage Numbers For Players 251-600 at walesrugbyleague.co.uk

1974 births
Living people
Oldham R.L.F.C. players
Place of birth missing (living people)
Rugby league wingers
Swinton Lions players
United States national rugby league team players
Wales national rugby league team players
Welsh rugby league players